Kasson Brook (also known as Cassan Brook) is a tributary of Mehoopany Creek in Wyoming County, Pennsylvania, in the United States. The stream is not designated as an impaired waterbody and is classified as a High-Quality Coldwater Fishery. It is one of several streams to cut through South Mountain.

Course
Kasson Brook begins on South Mountain in Forkston Township. It flows north-northwest for several tenths of a mile, entering a deep valley. The stream then turns west for a few tenths of a mile before turning north-northwest for more than a mile. It then exits its valley, crosses Windy Valley Road, and reaches its confluence with Mehoopany Creek.

Geography and geology

Kasson Brook is one of five large brooks to divide a large, flat-topped mountain along Mehoopany Creek. Coal smut was also reported at a site at the stream's headwaters in the late 1800s.

Since 2000, a streambank stabilization project has been done on Kasson Brook. Some stream redirection has been done in the vicinity of Kasson Brook's confluence with Mehoopany Creek. This has been controversial among locals, who say that the geographical alterations cause flooding on their property.

Hydrology and watershed
The mouth of the stream is in the United States Geological Survey quadrangle of Dutch Mountain. However, its source is in the quadrangle of Noxen. The stream joins Mehoopany Creek at the village of Kasson Brook.

Kasson Brook is not designated as an impaired waterbody.

History and recreation
Kasson Brook was entered into the Geographic Names Information System on August 2, 1979. Its identifier in the Geographic Names Information System is 1198961. The stream is also known as Cassan Brook.

At one point, the Civilian Conservation Corp had a camp on Kasson Brook. A concrete tee beam bridge carrying State Route 3001 over Kasson Brook was built in Forkston Township in 1953. In March 2016, the Pennsylvania Department of Environmental Protection collected samples from the stream in response to a request to re-evaluate these streams, as the streams in the Mehoopany Creek watershed had not been assessed in several years.

Pennsylvania State Game Lands are in the vicinity of Kasson Brook. The stream was given its designation as a wild trout stream in 2013. This designation does not affect the way the stream is managed.

Biology
Wild trout naturally reproduce in Kasson Brook from its headwaters downstream to its mouth. The stream is classified as a High-Quality Coldwater Fishery. Its designated use is for aquatic life.

The mouth of Kasson Brook is the uppermost limit of trout stocking on Mehoopany Creek.

See also
Scouten Brook, next tributary of Mehoopany Creek going downstream
Henry Lott Brook, next tributary of Mehoopany Creek going upstream
List of rivers of Pennsylvania

References

External links
Kasson Brook

Tributaries of Mehoopany Creek